Romanovka is a rural locality (a village) in Partizansky Selsoviet, Meleuzovsky District, Bashkortostan, Russia. The population was 5 as of 2010. There are 2 streets.

Geography 
Romanovka is located 12 km west of Meleuz (the district's administrative centre) by road. Mikhaylovka is the nearest rural locality.

References 

Rural localities in Meleuzovsky District